Pseudoerinna is a genus of flies in the family Pelecorhynchidae.

Species
Pseudoerinna fuscata Shiraki, 1932
Pseudoerinna jonesi (Cresson, 1919)

References

Further reading

 

Tabanoidea genera
Pelecorhynchidae
Diptera of North America
Diptera of Asia